Rochelle is a city in Ogle County, Illinois. The population was 9,446 at the 2020 census.

History 
Originally named Hickory Grove, the town sits at the intersection of two rail lines, the Burlington Northern Santa Fe and the Union Pacific. Having a number of granaries holding corn, wheat and other crops for shipping eastward, the town was an important rail link for farmers. 
 
After World War II, Rochelle grew, becoming a center for Swift Meat Packing and Del Monte canned vegetables such as asparagus, corn, green beans, and peas. 

The community is home to the popular Rochelle Railroad Park where visitors from across the country come to watch passing trains at the intersection of the BNSF and Union Pacific Railroads; the Chicagoland Skydiving Center and Flight Deck Restaurant where diners watch jumpers jump from a perfectly good airplane; and the Kennay Farms Distillery just west of Rochelle.  

On April 9, 2015, parts of the city suffered damage when an EF4 tornado struck near the outskirts of the town.

Geography
Rochelle is located along the Kyte River (commonly, if inaccurately, known to most locals as "Kyte Creek"). It is also located near the junction of Interstates 39 and 88.

Demographics

2020 census

Note: the US Census treats Hispanic/Latino as an ethnic category. This table excludes Latinos from the racial categories and assigns them to a separate category. Hispanics/Latinos can be of any race.

2000 Census
As of the census of 2000, there were 9,424 people, 3,688 households, and 2,415 families living in the city. The racial makeup of the city was 86.81% White, 1.14% African American, 0.49% Native American, 0.92% Asian, 0.02% Pacific Islander, 8.69% from other races, and 1.93% from two or more races. Hispanic or Latino of any race were 19.16% of the population.

There were 3,688 households, out of which 33.4% had children under the age of 18 living with them, 49.7% were married couples living together, 11.1% had a female householder with no husband present, and 34.5% were non-families. Of all households 29.3% were made up of individuals, and 12.1% had someone living alone who was 65 years of age or older. The average household size was 2.52 and the average family size was 3.13.

In the city, the population was spread out, with 27.1% under the age of 18, 10.1% from 18 to 24, 28.7% from 25 to 44, 19.6% from 45 to 64, and 14.5% who were 65 years of age or older. The median age was 34 years. For every 100 females, there were 97.0 males. For every 100 females age 18 and over, there were 93.1 males.

The median income for a household in the city was $37,984, and the median income for a family was $46,563. Males had a median income of $35,890 versus $25,058 for females. The per capita income for the city was $18,139. About 7.6% of families and 10.4% of the population were below the poverty line, including 11.1% of those under age 18 and 4.3% of those age 65 or over.

Education 
Rochelle is served by two separate school districts. Rochelle Community Consolidated District 231 serves Rochelle and limited areas just outside town. District 231 has four elementary schools serving grades K–5: Abraham Lincoln Elementary, Central Elementary, Floyd J. Tilton Elementary, and Phillip May Elementary. The district also operates one middle school, Rochelle Middle School, serving grades 6–8. Rochelle Township High School District 212 operates Rochelle Township High School. About half of the high school's students come from Rochelle and District 231; the remaining students come from a number of outlying communities, including Kings, Steward, Creston, Hillcrest, Esmond, and Lindenwood.

There is also a private school named, St. Paul Lutheran School which enrolls children from the age of three, and up through the eighth grade.

Transportation

Rochelle Railroad Park has spawned many imitators, such as the Railroad Platform in Folkston, Georgia. For many years the Whitcomb Locomotive Works, founded by George Dexter Whitcomb, manufactured industrial locomotives as well as the Partin Palmer automobile, in Rochelle.

Rochelle is also home to Union Pacific's Global III Intermodal Facility. At the time it opened it was Union Pacific's largest intermodal facility. Construction on the state-of-the-art facility was completed in 2003. On May 2, 2019, it was announced the yard would be closing in July 2019.

The Illinois River Energy ethanol plant is located in Rochelle.

Rochelle owns and operates Rochelle Municipal Airport.

Hub
Rochelle is known as the "Hub City" because of its location at the intersection of several major transportation routes. The first transcontinental highway in the United States, the Lincoln Highway, passed through Rochelle, as did US-51, one of the first highways to go the full north–south length of the United States. Both these roads have diminished in importance (and are now state highways 38 and 251, respectively), but Rochelle continues to be crossed by major highways, especially Interstates 88 and 39. Besides roadways, Rochelle is also crossed by two major rail lines; the Union Pacific Railroad and BNSF Railway mainlines cross inside of the city limits. The effect, as seen on a map, was one of the spokes of an old wagon wheel meeting at the "hub", and thus the nickname was born.
Today, literally dozens of businesses carry the moniker "Hub City", including furniture stores, shopping centers, realty firms, dry cleaners, and many others. Even the local high school's teams are known as the "Hubs".

Rochelle was once a stop for passenger trains operated by the Chicago, Burlington & Quincy, and its successor, the Burlington Northern, such as North Coast Limited. The town saw its last passenger train in 1971, and in 2007, the depot, which had been built in 1921, was demolished.

Notable people 

 Joan Allen, actress
 Joanna Baker, professor of ancient languages
 Delos W. Baxter, Illinois state senator, lawyer, and mayor of Rochelle
 Stan Campbell, pro football player
 Mabel Craft Deering, journalist, born in Rochelle
 William Gehring, Professor of Cognitive Psychology and one of the discoverers of Error Related Negativity
 Lloyd Ingraham, actor
 Paul R. Lawrence, Harvard professor and pioneer of contingency theory
 William W. May, American athlete, competed in the 1908 London Olympics, Rochelle Township High School graduate and 1905 State Champion in the 50 yard dash
 Daniel Van Kirk, comedian
Judith C. Toth, member of the Maryland House of Delegates (1975–1990)

Notable buildings 
 William H. Holcomb House
 City and Town Hall
 Flagg Township Public Library
 The Hub Theater

See also
Impact of the 2019–20 coronavirus pandemic on the meat industry in the United States

References

External links

 

 
Cities in Illinois
Cities in Ogle County, Illinois